Kenneth F. Sutherland (October 2, 1888 on Coney Island, Kings County, New York – November 14, 1954 in Sea Gate, Brooklyn, New York City) was an American politician from New York.

Life

He was the Democratic leader of Coney Island from 1917 until his death in 1954.

Sutherland was a member of the New York State Assembly (Kings Co., 16th D.) in 1918; and a member of the New York State Senate (4th D.) in 1919 and 1920.

In 1933, he supported Joseph V. McKee for Mayor of New York City, and was removed by Mayor John P. O'Brien from his post as Assistant to the President of the Board of Aldermen.

In June 1938, Sutherland was appointed as General Clerk of the New York Supreme Court in Brooklyn.

He was Chairman of the Kings County Democratic Committee from 1952 to 1954.

He died on November 14, 1954, at his home at 3709 Atlantic Avenue in Sea Gate, Brooklyn.

Sources
 SUTHERLAND LOSES ALDERMANIC POST in NYT on October 14, 1933 (subscription required)
 SUTHERLAND NAMED TO $10,000 COURT JOB in NYT on June 14, 1938 (subscription required)
 KINGS DEMOCRATS ELECT SUTHERAND in NYT on December 30, 1952 (subscription required)
 K. F. SUTHERLAND DIES IN BROOKLYN in NYT on November 15, 1954 (subscription required)

1888 births
1954 deaths
Democratic Party New York (state) state senators
Politicians from Brooklyn
Democratic Party members of the New York State Assembly
20th-century American politicians
People from Sea Gate, Brooklyn